Miguel Arizpe Jiménez (born 17 November 1948) is a Mexican politician from the Institutional Revolutionary Party. From 2000 to 2003 he served as Deputy of the LVIII Legislature of the Mexican Congress representing Coahuila.

See also 
 1993, Coahuila state election
 List of presidents of Saltillo Municipality

References

1948 births
Living people
Politicians from Monterrey
Institutional Revolutionary Party politicians
20th-century Mexican politicians
21st-century Mexican politicians
Universidad Iberoamericana alumni
Municipal presidents in Coahuila
Members of the Chamber of Deputies (Mexico) for Coahuila